Plesiolampas is an extinct genus of echinoids that lived in the Eocene. Its remains have been found in Africa and Asia.

Sources

 Fossils (Smithsonian Handbooks) by David Ward (Page 181)

External links
Plesiolampas in the Paleobiology Database

Cassiduloida
Prehistoric echinoid genera
Eocene animals
Prehistoric echinoderms of Africa
Prehistoric echinoderms of Asia